Claudia Marcela Conserva Pérez (born 12 January 1974, Santiago) is a Chilean actress, model and television presenter of Italian-Arbereshe ancestry. She studied ballet and worked in publicity and TV programs when she was a child and in 1990 she won Miss 17. She met her husband Juan Carlos Valdivia in Extra Jóvenes (Chilevisión). They have two children.

Teleseries

Television programs

References

External links
 

1974 births
Living people
Actresses from Santiago
Chilean television presenters
Chilean television actresses
Chilean telenovela actresses
Chilean people of Arbëreshë descent
Chilean people of Italian descent
Chilean women television presenters
Chilean television personalities